The A3 highway is a highway in Nigeria. It runs generally north from Port Harcourt through Aba, Umuahia, Okigwe, Enugu, Ngwo, Makurdi, Lafia, Jos, Bauchi and Potiskum thence east via Damaturu and Maiduguri to the border with Cameroon at Gamboru. The  continuation through Cameroon connects to N'Djamena, the capital of Chad.

Gamboru Bridge 
On May 9, 2014, it was reported that the bridge linking Gamboru to the rest of Nigeria, and also linking the immigration checkpoints of both Cameroon and Nigeria, had been destroyed in an attack by jihadists Boko Haram.
Hundreds of heavy duty trucks plying the Chad-Nigeria highway along Gamboru-Ngala Local Government conveying commodities from the two countries are now left stranded on either sides of the bridge.
On May 13, 2014, the House of Representatives "called on the Federal Government to rebuild the Gamboru Bridge linking the border town with other parts of Borno State."

On 9 February 2020, a massacre occurred on the A3 in Auno between Damaturu and Maiduguri.

References 

Highways in Nigeria